Samuel Robert Newton (November 23, 1881 – October 11, 1944) was a Canadian sport shooter, who competed in the 1924 Summer Olympics. In 1924 he won a silver medal in team trap event.

References

External links
Samuel Newton's profile at Sports Reference.com

1881 births
1944 deaths
Sportspeople from Drummondville
Canadian male sport shooters
Olympic shooters of Canada
Shooters at the 1924 Summer Olympics
Olympic silver medalists for Canada
Trap and double trap shooters
Olympic medalists in shooting
Medalists at the 1924 Summer Olympics
Anglophone Quebec people
20th-century Canadian people